Cape Anamur is a headland on the Mediterranean Sea coast of Mersin Province, Turkey.

The ancient city Anemurium lies on the hills to the north of the cape. The town Ören is to the north and the ilçe (district center) modern  Anamur is to the north east.

See also
Anamur Lighthouse

References

 

Landforms of Mersin Province
Anamur
Anamur District
Mediterranean Sea